Kurt Michael Kanaskie (born April 14, 1958) is an American college basketball coach who is currently the associate head coach for men's basketball at UNC Wilmington. Previously, Kanaskie was head coach positions at Lock Haven, IUP, and Drake.

Early life and education
Born in Enola, Pennsylvania, Kanaskie grew up in nearby Mechanicsburg and attended Cumberland Valley High School, in which he was an all-state basketball player. Kanaskie later attended La Salle College (now La Salle University) and played basketball for the La Salle Explorers under head coach Paul Westhead from 1976 to 1980. As a senior in 1979–80, Kanaskie averaged 14.5 points and 2.7 rebounds and helped La Salle win the ECC Tournament and make the 1980 NCAA tournament. Kanaskie graduated from La Salle in 1980 with a Bachelor of Science in business administration.

Coaching career
In the 1980 NBA draft, the Golden State Warriors selected Kanaskie as the second pick in the eighth round, 162nd overall. That year, Kanaskie became a college basketball assistant coach at South Carolina under Bill Foster. After five years in that position, Kanaskie served as head coach at Division II Lock Haven University from 1985 to 1988. Inheriting a program that won only 18 games in the past four seasons, Kanaskie led Lock Haven to 15 wins in his first season and ended with a 55–32 overall record. The Pennsylvania State Athletic Conference (PSAC) named Kanaskie its Coach of the Year for the West Division in 1987 and 1988 and co-Coach of the Year in the conference in 1987.

In 1988, Kanaskie became head coach at Indiana University of Pennsylvania (IUP), another PSAC school. In eight seasons at IUP, Kanaskie had a 152–75 record after inheriting a program with four straight losing seasons. Kanaskie led IUP to its first-ever NCAA tournament in 1994 and earned two more West Division PSAC Coach of the Year honors in 1994 and 1995.

Kanaskie moved up to the Division I level as head coach at Drake University, a position he held from 1996 to 2003. When he began the job, Drake was under NCAA probation and had few returning scholarship players. Drake won only five games in Kanaskie's first two seasons but improved to 12–16 (8–10 Missouri Valley Conference) in 2000–01. Kanaskie received a five-year contract extension after that season but still did not deliver a winning season. Days after the 2002–03 season, both Kanaskie's lawyer and the Drake athletic director indicated that Kanaskie would keep his job. However, Kanaskie resigned on April 11, 2003, ending his tenure at Drake with an overall 62–136 record.

Kanaskie returned to being an assistant coach in 2003 at Penn State under Ed DeChellis. In 2009, DeChellis promoted Kanaskie to associate head coach. When DeChellis became head coach at Navy in 2011, Kanaskie followed and also became associate head coach.

After one year at Navy, Kanaskie became assistant coach at Virginia Tech under James Johnson in 2012. Johnson was fired after two seasons. Kanaskie moved to Air Force as assistant coach under Dave Pilipovich in 2014.

On April 6, 2020, Kanaskie was hired as an assistant coach under Takayo Siddle at UNCW.

Head coaching record 
Sources:

References

1958 births
Living people
Air Force Falcons men's basketball coaches
American men's basketball coaches
American men's basketball players
Basketball coaches from Pennsylvania
Basketball players from Pennsylvania
Drake Bulldogs men's basketball coaches
Golden State Warriors draft picks
Guards (basketball)
IUP Crimson Hawks men's basketball coaches
La Salle Explorers men's basketball players
Lock Haven Bald Eagles men's basketball coaches
Navy Midshipmen men's basketball coaches
Penn State Nittany Lions basketball coaches
People from Mechanicsburg, Pennsylvania
South Carolina Gamecocks men's basketball coaches
UNC Wilmington Seahawks men's basketball coaches
Virginia Tech Hokies men's basketball coaches